Hank Mobley and His All Stars is an album by jazz saxophonist Hank Mobley, released on the Blue Note label in 1957 as BLP 1544. It was recorded on January 13, 1957, and features Mobley along with the other members of the first lineup of the Jazz Messengers: pianist Horace Silver, bassist Doug Watkins, and drummer Art Blakey, with vibraphonist Milt Jackson of Modern Jazz Quartet.

Reception
The Allmusic review by Scott Yanow awarded the album 4 stars, stating: "An above-average effort from some of the best."

Track listing 
All compositions by Hank Mobley

 "Reunion" - 6:55
 "Ultra Marine" - 10:36
 "Don't Walk" - 7:50
 "Lower Stratosphere" - 6:37
 "Mobley's Musings" - 6:04

Personnel 
 Hank Mobley - tenor saxophone
 Milt Jackson - vibes
 Horace Silver - piano
 Doug Watkins - bass
 Art Blakey - drums

References 

1957 albums
Albums produced by Alfred Lion
Albums recorded at Van Gelder Studio
Blue Note Records albums
Hank Mobley albums
Hard bop albums